The Portland & Rochester Railroad, established in 1867, was an important predecessor railway of the Rochester to Portland branch line of the Boston and Maine Railroad. It was founded in the merger of several smaller shortline rail transport companies, the oldest being the shortline York and Cumberland Railroad which was formed in 1846 to connect the seaport facilities of Portland, Maine, to the water powered manufacturing and textile industries along the Quampheagan Falls on the Salmon Falls River in the twin towns of South Berwick, Maine, and Rollinsford, New Hampshire (ca 1850).
 
A year later another investor group began a railway leading inland to the upcoming mill town of Nashua, New Hampshire, inspiring the easier to construct leg founded as the Nashua & Rochester Railroad (1847). The York and Cumberland opened to Gorham, Maine, in 1851 under the direction of Maine railroad pioneer John A. Poor and was extended in 1853. The York and Cumberland was reorganized as the Portland and Rochester Railroad in 1867, and was completed to Rochester, New Hampshire, in 1871, providing a connection from Canada via the Grand Trunk Railway in Portland to inland cities further west, including Worcester, Massachusetts, via a connection with the Nashua and Rochester.

While the Nashua and Rochester merged with the Worcester & Nashua Railroad to become the Worcester, Nashua and Rochester Railroad in 1883, a company that in turn was leased by the Boston and Maine in 1886, the Portland and Maine remained independent until 1900, when it too was absorbed into the Boston and Maine as it grew into a regional giant. The line continued to operate in full until in 1952, when the stretch between Rochester and Springvale was abandoned, but the line from Springvale to Westbrook operated from 1949 to 1961 as the shortline Sanford and Eastern Railroad, which also operated trackage between Springvale and Sanford that was once part of the Atlantic Shore Line interurban system. Today only portions of the line in Westbrook and Portland still see traffic, being serviced by the Portland Terminal Company.

References

1867 establishments in Maine
1883 disestablishments in the United States
Predecessors of the Boston and Maine Railroad
Defunct Maine railroads
Defunct Massachusetts railroads
Defunct New Hampshire railroads
Maine railroads
American companies established in 1867